Shelley Funke Frommeyer (born June 21, 1969) is an American politician from Kentucky. She is a member of the Republican Party and has represented District 24 in the Kentucky Senate since January 1, 2023. Frommeyer is a certified financial planner, and she resides in Alexandria, Kentucky.

References 

1969 births
21st-century American politicians
Living people
Republican Party Kentucky state senators
Women state legislators in Kentucky
21st-century American women politicians